Harry Goldsborough (14 September 1920 – 3 February 1994) was an Irish hurler who played as a midfielder at senior level for the Tipperary county team.

Goldsborough made his first appearance for the team during the 1945 championship and was a regular member of the starting fifteen until his retirement after the 1948 championship. During that time he won one All-Ireland medal and one Munster medal, At club level Goldsborough played with Thurles Sarsfields, Army and St Finbarr's.

References

1920 births
1994 deaths
All-Ireland Senior Hurling Championship winners
St Finbarr's hurlers
Thurles Sarsfields hurlers
Tipperary inter-county hurlers